Shokufeh Kavani (born 1970) is an Iranian-born Australian contemporary nurse, artist, painter, and translator. She is primarily known as a translator and as an abstract painter. She is fluent in Australian English in addition to her native language Persian. She is currently living in Sydney.

Early life and education
Shokufeh was born in 1970 in Tehran, Iran. She was only age eight when the Iranian Revolution (1978–1979) took place. She received her education first at the Saadi Primary and Secondary School, and followed by studies at Jeanne D'Arc High School.

She went on to the Bandar-Abbas medical university for a bachelor's degree in nursing, before migrating to Australia as a professional nurse.

Life and career 

At age 19, Kavani started painting in reaction to the events that were happening around her. The eight-year Iran-Iraq War had a deep impact on her. While in Iran she carried on painting, but never exhibited her work in Iran.

In 1994, Kavani earned a First Certificate in English from the Cambridge University centre in Tehran. She started translating "The Whirling Dervishes" by Ira (Shems) Friedlander, a Best Seller published in 2004 (1382) by Zaryab Publishers. The book is about the whirling dervishes and the ceremonies with which they are involved. The story of Mevlana Jallaledin-Balkhi known as Rumi in the western world is embedded in the narrative. The book has black-and-white photos of the Sema, a Whirling Dervishes ceremony which opens a window to the mysterious and esoteric world of the Dervishes. The majority of the photographs were taken by Ira (Shems) Friedlander. The rest are by Nazih Ozal. The new approach to the history of the Mevlevieh sect and their music over the last 100 years makes the book unique.

In 1997, Kavani migrated to Sydney, Australia and started working and studying again for her bachelor's degree in Nursing from Charles Sturt University. She also continued painting and in 2003 had her first solo exhibition, "Persian Graffiti", promoted by the Iranian writer, Shahrnush Parsipur. The exhibition gained a great deal of attention in the Australian media. After the 2005 Cronulla riots, she joined the art group " TAH, Art for Humanity " and participated in twelve group exhibitions all over Australia to raise awareness against racism. Some sale proceeds of the group went to an Afghan Charity, Mahboba's Promise, to support Afghan widows and orphans. These humanitarian efforts earned her nominations for the "Australian of the Year Award in 2005, 2007, 2008 and also in 2013, and for the Pride of Australian Medal in 2005 and 2007 by The Daily Telegraph (Sydney) newspaper.

Kavani's translation of an article, Dog and the long winter, from a book by Shahrnush Parsipur, was tabled in the Conference on Women and Depression in 2007 held in Sydney. In 2008, her painting, Dog and the long winter was chosen for a poster for the Women's Mental Health International Conference in Melbourne, Australia. The English version of the book Dog and the long winter was published in 2011 by Nur Publishing company in America  and the author, Shahrnush Parsipur, dedicated the book to Shokufeh Kavani.

Kavani continues to exhibit her paintings regularly. Two of her paintings featured among the official final selections in the My Favourite Movie Moments exhibition, the 2006 Sydney Film Festival and also her paper appeared in First International Symposium about Iranian Cinema. Two paintings have been selected for 100 years of imprisonment, an exhibition organised in the United States in support of political prisoners in Iran.

In 2006, Kavani was selected to present "Prince Claus Awards" to Dr. Michael Mel in Papua New Guinea – University of Goroka alongside the Dutch Ambassador H.E.Mr. Niek van Zutphen. She also attended the main "Prince Claus Awards" ceremony in 2008 and met the Dutch Royal family and the laureates of the awards.
She has also participated in  Fictive Days   Sixten Kai Nielsen, a project organised by www.wooloo.org for the Berlin Festival in 2008, wherein she played the role of Queen Elizabeth I of England along with seven others playing famous characters in the history of cinema.

Kavani work was the official selection for the Australian Day special exhibition at the gallery of " At the vanishing point " in Sydney. In 2009, her translation of Anita Heiss's  "Who am I? The Diary of Mary Talence" was published in Tehran by Morvarid Publishers. This has been positively reviewed in the press by Shahrnush Parsipur, Asadollah Amraee and Elaheh Dehnavi and acclaimed by the public.

In 2010, Kavani became the first Iranian-born Australian recipient of the Edna Ryan Awards in the category of Art, bestowed by the New South Wales Women's Electoral Lobby to women who have been pioneers in different walks of life.

Kavani currently lives in Sydney, works as a nurse and also completed her post-graduate degree of " Genetic Counselling " from Charles Sturt University,  paints and intends to take participate in more exhibitions and works on translating another book. Three of her paintings appeared in 2011 Florence Biennale, Italy.

In July 2015, she married Ali Taghvai, the only son of the Iranian film-maker, Nasser Taghvai and the Iranian writer, Shahrnush Parsipur. In 2019, they published a book of poetry by the name of " on the boat of life " by Mehri Publication house, London, England which contains Ali Taghvai's poems and Shokufeh Kavani's drawings for his poems.

Also in 2019, she took a very active part as the cultural adviser to the Australian author, Clare Atkins in the process of writing Clare's second book Between Us which became the book of the year 2019 and also nominated for so many awards including the prestigious Australian Prime Minister Literary awards.

in June 2022, her art works featured in page 33 of the book " Introducing Iranian Artists 40/2021, معرفی  هنرمندان ایرانی  40/1400  by Curator Mansour Azadkam published in Iran, in a Collabrative collaboration between Galerie Nicolas Flamel, Paris  & Tarhe Faza Institute - Fara Group, Iran.

Further reading 
 Friedlander, Ira (Shems) 2004, " Whirling Dervishes: being an account of the Sufi order known as the Mevlevis and its founder, the poet and mystic Mevlana Jalalu'Ddin Rumi", Shokufeh Kavani (translated), Zaryab Publishers, Tehran, 
 Heiss, Anita 2009, "Who am I? The Diary of Mary Talence", Shokufeh Kavani (translated), Morvarid Publishers, Tehran, 
 Parsipur, Shahrnush 2018, " Dog and the long winter", Shokufeh Kavani (translated), Mehri Publication House, London, 
 Taghvai, Ali & Kavani, Shokufeh 2019, " On the Boat of Life " (Persian: سواربرقایق حیات), Shokufeh Kavani (Illustrated), Mehri Publication House (Persian: انتشارات مهری), London, 
Azadkam, Mansour 2022, " Introducing Iranian Artists 40/2021 " (Persian:  معرفی هنرمندان ایرانی  40/1400), Zarnevesht Publishing(), Tehran,

References 

1970 births
Living people
Iranian women painters
Australian women painters
Australian people of Iranian descent
People from Tehran
Australian contemporary painters
Iranian democracy activists
Iranian human rights activists
Iranian women's rights activists
Iranian women activists
Iranian translators
Iranian diaspora
20th-century translators
20th-century women writers
Charles Sturt University alumni
20th-century Iranian women artists
21st-century Iranian women artists